Ashad Ali (born 14 September 1986), nicknamed Adey or Adubarey, is a Maldivian footballer who plays as a midfielder for Club Valencia. He was a member of the Maldives national football team.

Club career
Ashad started his career at Victory Sports Club. He later joined VB Sports Club before joining the newly promoted side BG Sports Club 

In 2018, he signed a one year deal with Club Green Streets.

International career

International goals
Scores and results list the Maldives' goal tally first.

Penalty feinting incident 
Adey gained global notability after simulating a fall prior to the run up of a penalty shootout in the third place match of the 2014 AFC Challenge Cup against Afghanistan, deceiving goalkeeper Mansur Faqiryar. The match was won 7–8 to the Maldives.

A similar move was pulled off by Thomas Müller later that year during the 2014 FIFA World Cup (Germany v Algeria). In the 88th minute, Thomas Müller deceptively stumbled while lining up the kick, before getting up and running through the Algerian wall. A few days later, Müller admitted to a German TV reporter that the free kick was a designed play.

References

External links 
 
 
 

1986 births
Living people
Maldivian footballers
Maldives international footballers
Victory Sports Club players
People from Addu City
Association football forwards
Footballers at the 2006 Asian Games
Asian Games competitors for the Maldives
Club Eagles players